Angus McKay (October 2, 1852 – May 7, 1916) was an Ontario physician and political figure. He represented Oxford South in the Legislative Assembly of Ontario from 1886 to 1902 as a Liberal member.

He was born in Oxford Township, Oxford County, Canada West in 1852, the son of Donald McKay, a Scottish immigrant. He studied medicine at Trinity College in Toronto and at the Royal College of Physicians of Edinburgh. He set up practice in Ingersoll. McKay was an examiner for the College of Physicians and Surgeons of Ontario. In 1883, he served as a member of the Oxford County council. He died in East Nissouie, Oxford, Ontario in 1916.

References

External links
The Canadian parliamentary companion, 1887 JA Gemmill

The Canadian album : Men of Canada; or, Success by example ..., W Cochrane (1891)

1852 births
Physicians from Ontario
Ontario Liberal Party MPPs
Trinity College (Canada) alumni
University of Toronto alumni
People from Ingersoll, Ontario
1916 deaths